Cephetola mpangensis is a butterfly in the family Lycaenidae. It is found in Uganda, north-western Tanzania and Kenya. Its habitat consists of primary forests.

References

Butterflies described in 1962
Poritiinae